The Tullymore Classic was a tournament on the Symetra Tour, the LPGA's developmental tour. It was part of the Symetra Tour's schedule between 2015 and 2017. It was held at Tullymore Golf Resort in Stanwood, Michigan.

Winners

References

Former Symetra Tour events
Golf in Michigan